The police forces in the UK use a wide range of operational vehicles including compact cars, powerful estates and armoured police carriers. The main uses are patrol, response, tactical pursuit, and public order policing. Other vehicles used by British police include motorcycles, aircraft, and boats.

Incident response vehicle (IRV)

Incident response vehicles (IRVs) are used by UK police to respond to emergencies and to conduct proactive patrols. They are fitted with blue lights and sirens to warn other road users and pedestrians vehicles that they need to make way for the police vehicle. 

IRVs will generally carry equipment and lighting for use at traffic incidents, such as traffic cones, warning signs and basic first aid equipment. Many response cars in the UK now also carry mobile technology which can be linked to police databases and automatic number plate recognition (ANPR) technology.

Armed response vehicle (ARV)

Excluding the Police Service of Northern Ireland, police officers in the United Kingdom do not typically carry firearms. There are, however, a number of armed response vehicles (ARVs) in each police force area in which authorised firearms officers are carried.

Roads policing unit (RPU)

Roads policing units vehicles, also known as traffic cars, are faster police vehicles used by pursuit trained officers who are tasked responding to serious traffic collisions and conducting high speed pursuits, as well as traffic enforcement and criminals using the road to commit offences.  RPU cars carry specialist equipment, such as traffic cones, road closure signs or collisions, and scene preservation equipment. These vehicles are usually fitted with ANPR to assist in traffic enforcement.

Historically, cars such as the Wolseley 4/50 & 6/80, Jaguar Mark 2, Rover P6, Rover SD1, Rover 800 and Vauxhall Senator were commonly used.

Most roads policing vehicles are rated as 'high-performance', requiring traffic officers to undergo additional driving training to the 'advanced' standard. Officers are also commonly trained in the Tactical Pursuit and Containment (TPAC) manoeuvre to bring a pursuit to a halt.

Area car
Area cars sit between IRVs and RPUs. They are usually higher-performance vehicles similar to those in RPUs but operated by officers on response teams who respond to general emergency calls.

Motorcycle

Motorcycles are used by a number of services; usually the road policing unit. Police motorcycles are also used in road safety initiatives such as Bikesafe, a national programme to reduce motorcycle casualties where police motorcyclists provide advanced rider training to members of the public.

Some Metropolitan Police Special Escort Group officers and Parliamentary and Diplomatic Protection also use motorcycles.

A variety of motorcycles have been used by police. The Honda ST1300 Pan-European was a popular bike, but it was withdrawn from service by most forces in 2007, following the death of a Merseyside police motorcyclist in 2005 in an accident caused by an instability in the model when outfitted with police equipment.

Van and minibus

Police vans are widely used across the United Kingdom and incorporate a cage to hold prisoners. 

Larger vans are also used to act as mobile control room at major incidents, and may also carry specialised equipment such as hydraulic door entry and cutting tools.
Minibuses are used to carry groups of police officers, for example to public order and major incidents, and for inner-city patrols, such as the Metropolitan Police's Territorial Support Group. The minibuses are usually fitted with riot shields  to protect the windscreen from damage, or reinforced glass.

Other vehicles

Dog unit cars/vans
Horse trailers
Vehicle removal trucks
Mobile custody units
Bicycles

Livery and lighting

UK police forces typically use the battenburg pattern of yellow and blue retroreflective chequer-squares for their vehicles, on top of the base vehicle colour. 

Police cars, vans and minibuses may have aerial roof markings that help aircraft crew identify them. These can include the unique force code, vehicle identifying mark, or police division that the vehicle belongs to.

Under the Road Vehicle Lighting Regulations 1989, police vehicles may display blue flashing lights to alert other road users to their presence or when the driver feels that the journey needs to be undertaken urgently. These lights are usually mounted on the roof and incorporated into the standard vehicle system of external lights. Most police vehicles are also fitted with a siren. In addition to blue lights, many traffic and incident response cars are fitted with flashing red lights that are only visible at the rear of the vehicle. These indicate that the vehicle is stopped or moving slowly.

Equipment
Police vehicles may carry:

Whilst officers typically carry their personal equipment – such as their baton, CS/PAVA spray and Taser on their body – armed officers store most weaponry in a gun safe. This is located in the rear of the vehicle, and can be accessed from the front. Armed officers do, however, always carry their other PPE and sidearm on their person.

Aircraft

All police air support in England and Wales is provided by the National Police Air Service (NPAS). NPAS uses Eurocopter EC135 and EC145 helicopters, alongside Vulcanair P68R planes. Twin engined aircraft are required, as air support units (ASU) are often required to fly over urban areas.

Aircraft are fitted with an array of surveillance, navigation and communication technology to help them with a wide variety of tasks. The specific tasks that any one police helicopter performs will vary from force to force, but common deployments are for missing person searches, vehicle pursuits, the tracking of suspects, and maintaining public order.

Scotland and Northern Ireland have separate air support units. Police Scotland utilises a single EC135, whilst the Police Service of Northern Ireland operates two EC135 and one EC145 helicopters.

Police aircraft can be used for MEDEVACs, however, these are rarely performed due to the availability of HM Coastguard helicopters and charitably funded air ambulances – both of which offer enhanced medical care with the availability of a paramedic and/or doctor on board.

Crew
A single pilot civilian operates each aircraft. Most pilots operating police aircraft come from a military background – and as such have the required flying hours and experience to safely fly at low-levels and for prolonged periods of time.

The standard crew in a police helicopter consists of two tactical flight officers (TFO). A front seat observer is responsible for operating the helicopter's surveillance systems. The rear seat observer, responsible for communications using the TETRA radio and downlink systems. NPAS' P68 fixed-wing aircraft only operate with one TFO due to weight restrictions.

TFOs are sworn police officers who have extensive experience on the ground, and also carry all the equipment a normal police officer would onboard – should the aircraft be required to land to assist or make an arrest. All pilots are civilians, and have no police powers.

Watercraft

Police forces whose area includes significant waterways often include marine support units. Not only do these units police the waterways, but they also maintain a capability for waterborne rescue, usually in co-operation with HM Coastguard.

See also 
Jam sandwich livery (Phased out of London Metropolitan Police Service in 2012)

References

External links

 Restored examples of many types of UK police vehicles
 Western Counties (Avon & Somerset and Gloucestershire) Police Helicopter Information Page
 United Kingdom Emergency Vehicles (mainly police)
 UK and International Emergency Vehicles, including police
 Private collection

Law enforcement in the United Kingdom
Vehicles of the United Kingdom